Stephen Mattoon (May 5, 1816 – 1889) was an American Presbyterian missionary who worked in Siam from 1847 to 1864. His works include the translation of the New Testament into the Thai language.

Career
Mattoon served as translator for Townsend Harris in spring 1856. Harris stopped in Siam to update the treaty between the US and Siam. Harris then proceeded to Japan for his appointment as envoy to Japan. Mattoon was then appointed as the first consul from the United States in Siam.

After returning to the U.S., Mattoon was appointed in 1870 as the first President of Johnson C. Smith University, which was known as the Biddle Memorial Institute in 1870 and then as Biddle University during his tenure as president, to 1884. Mattoon's grandson Norman Thomas was the Socialist Party candidate for President six times.

References

Presbyterian missionaries in Thailand
American Presbyterian missionaries
1889 deaths
1816 births
People from Champion, New York
19th-century American translators
American expatriates in Thailand
Missionary linguists